Juliano André Pereira da Silva (born 13 October 1986 in Parapuã, São Paulo), commonly known as Juliano, is a Brazilian footballer who currently plays as a defender for Grêmio Novorizontino.

References

1986 births
Living people
Brazilian footballers
Association football defenders
Brazilian expatriate footballers
Brazilian expatriate sportspeople in Albania
Expatriate footballers in Albania
Campeonato Brasileiro Série B players
Campeonato Brasileiro Série C players
Campeonato Brasileiro Série D players
Kategoria Superiore players
Clube Atlético Tricordiano players
Clube Atlético Sorocaba players
União Agrícola Barbarense Futebol Clube players
Esporte Clube Juventude players
Avaí FC players
Joinville Esporte Clube players
Foz do Iguaçu Futebol Clube players
FK Kukësi players
Associação Desportiva Cabofriense players
Clube Atlético Bragantino players
Footballers from São Paulo (state)